Noted musicians who play the hammered dulcimer include:

A

 Matthew Abelson
 Azam Ali (santur)

B

 Billy Bennington
 Tarun Bhattacharya (santoor)
 Blue Man Group
 Basia Bulat (occasionally, main instrument is autoharp)
 Botanist

C

 Evan Carawan (multi-instrumentalist)
 Guy Carawan (multi-instrumentalist)
 Dorothy Carter (multi-instrumentalist)
 Mitzie Collins
 Russell Cook
 Jimmy Cooper
 Jim Couza

D

 Malcolm Dalglish
 Constance Demby

F

 Chris Funk (multi-instrumentalist, plays occasionally)

G

 Lisa Gerrard (yangqin)

H

 Dana Hamilton
 Sue Harris
 Steve Hogarth (multi-instrumentalist, mainly keyboard player)
 Brenda Hunter

K
 Ardavan Kamkar (santur)

L

 Dan Landrum
 James Lascelles
 Sigi Lemmerer (hackbrett)
 Arjen Lucassen

M

 John McCutcheon
 Parviz Meshkatian (santur)
 Ion Miu (cimbalom)
 Rich Mullins (multi-instrumentalist)
 Tom MacKenzie

N

 New Victory Band (Christine Coe)
 Joanna Newsom (mainly known for harp)
 Simon Nicol (mainly known for guitar)

P

 Carl Palmer (in Still...You Turn Me On)
 Chet Parker
 Faramarz Payvar (santur)
 Neil Peart (mainly known for drums)
 Brendan Perry (yangqin)
 Kate Price

R

 John Rea
 Sam Rizzetta

S

 Maggie Sansone
 Timothy Seaman
 Rahul Sharma (santoor)
 Shivkumar Sharma (santoor)
 Geoff Smith
 Bill Spence

T

 Richard Thompson (mainly known for guitar)
 Trapezoid

V

 Paul Van Arsdale

W

 Collin Walcott (mainly known for sitar, tabla and percussion)
 Joemy Wilson
 Steven Wilson (mainly known for guitar and keyboard)

References

Hammered dulcimer players